Lion is an urban neighborhood of Belgrade, the capital of Serbia. It is located in Belgrade's municipality of Zvezdara.

Location 
Lion is located along the old Belgrade's longest street, Bulevar kralja Aleksandra, 3 kilometers south-east of downtown Belgrade (Terazije). It borders the neighborhoods of Bulbuder on the north-east, Đeram on the west, Lipov Lad on the south-west, Denkova Bašta on the south, and Cvetkova Pijaca on the east.

Characteristics 
Before World War II, Lion was a commercial centar on the boulevard, with many tobacco and grocery stores, bookshops and craftsman shops. The neighborhood got its name from the kafana "Lion", which was named after the French town of Lyon. Kafana was a favorite place for pre-war state employees, officers and teachers and it was known for pool, chess and domino tournaments, so as for the Sunday's dances for the youth. Unfortunately, the Lion kafana doesn't exist anymore, it has been replaced since by other commercial venues.

Though mainly residential area today, Lion still has a developed commercial section along the boulevard so as several schools. Stadium of FK Hajduk and theater of "Zvezdara Teatar" are also located in the neighborhood. The population of Lion was 5,509 by the 2002 census.

Next to the Sixth Belgrade Gymnasium there is a park of the same name, sometimes also called Slavujev Potok Park.

References 

Neighborhoods of Belgrade
Zvezdara